Swing's Our Thing is an album by American jazz saxophonist Johnny Hodges and pianist Earl Hines featuring performances recorded in 1967 and released on the Verve label.

Reception

The AllMusic site awarded the album 3 stars stating, "The jumping tunes are given concise performances (six songs are under three minutes long and none are longer than 4:10), but the musicians take advantage of every second they have on this rather brief album. ...this is a notable obscurity from some of jazz's all-time greats".

Track listing
All compositions by Johnny Hodges, except as indicated.
 "Open Ears" - 4:10
 "Mean to Me" (Fred E. Ahlert, Roy Turk) - 2:28 	
 "Doll Valley" (Tom Whaley) - 4:08 	
 "Can a Moose Crochet?" - 2:58
 "One Night in Trinidad" (Earl Hines) - 2:48
 "Night Train to Memphis" (Cat Anderson, Duke Ellington) - 3:40 	
 "Bustin' with Buster" - 3:24 	
 "Over the Rainbow" (Harold Arlen, Yip Harburg) - 2:27 	
 "Do It Yourself" (Anderson) - 2:15 	
 "The Cannery Walk" (Hines) - 2:25

Personnel
Johnny Hodges - alto saxophone
Earl "Fatha" Hines - piano
Cat Anderson - trumpet
Buster Cooper - trombone
Jimmy Hamilton - clarinet, tenor saxophone
Jeff Castleman - double bass
Sam Woodyard - drums

References 

1968 albums
Johnny Hodges albums
Earl Hines albums
Albums produced by Esmond Edwards
Verve Records albums